Sir Robert Milton Worcester,  (born 21 December 1933) is an American-born British pollster who is the founder of MORI (Market & Opinion Research International Ltd.) and a member and contributor to many voluntary organisations. He is a well-known figure in British public opinion research and political circles and as a media commentator, especially about voting intentions in British and American elections.

Early life 
A Kansas City native, Worcester graduated from the University of Kansas in 1955, and following service in the US Army Corps of Engineers in Korea worked with management consultants McKinsey & Company.

Career 
In 1965, Worcester joined Opinion Research Corporation as chief financial officer before coming to Britain in 1969 to found MORI, then a joint-venture of ORC and National Opinion Polls, becoming the principal owner four years later.

He was appointed chancellor of the University of Kent in 2007 and retired from the role in 2014 and was succeeded by Gavin Esler. He is an emeritus governor of the London School of Economics and Political Science and visiting professor in the Government Department and is also visiting professor in the Institute of Contemporary British History at King's College London. He is also honorary professor in the Department of Politics and International Studies at Warwick University.  Earlier he was visiting professor in the Graduate Centre for Journalism at City University and in the Department of Marketing at Strathclyde University. He is the Chancellor's Lecturer and adjunct professor of political science at the University of Kansas.

Worcester was principal investigator for the World Values Survey in Trinidad and Tobago (2006, 2010) and United Kingdom (1998). For two years he served as the president of the World Association for Public Opinion Research. He became a Patron of the UK Market Research Society in October 2012.

He is deputy chairman and trustee of the Magna Carta Trust and currently chairs the Magna Carta 2015 800th Anniversary Commemoration Committee, and is a governor of the Ditchley Foundation.  He is also a former member of the Fulbright Commission and a former governor of the English-Speaking Union and co-chaired with Lord Watson the Jamestown 400th Commemoration British Committee (2005–07).

He is immediate past president and former chair of the advisory council of the Institute for Business Ethics and has been on the Corporate Responsibility Advisory Board of Camelot. He was a member of the advisory council of the National Consumer Council and Forum for the Future.

He is a vice-president of the Royal Society of Wildlife Trusts, of the United Nations Association and of the European Atlantic Group and was president of ENCAMS (Keep Britain Tidy).  He is currently a vice-president and was a trustee of Wildfowl & Wetlands Trust and was a World Wide Fund for Nature (WWF) trustee. He is a vice-president of Protect Kent, the Kent Branch of the Campaign to Protect Rural England. From 1993 to 2010, he was chairman of the Pilgrims Society.

Worcester is a Deputy Lieutenant of the County of Kent and a Kent County Council appointed Kent Ambassador.  He was a non-executive director of Kent Messenger Group and chairman of Maidstone Radio, CTR 105.4 fm, and was a non-executive director of the Medway Maritime Hospital NHS Trust until 2004. Following the sale of MORI to the French research company Ipsos in October 2005, he became chairman of the Ipsos Public Affairs Research Advisory Board and an International Director of the Ipsos Group. Subsequently, in 2007 he became senior advisor to Ipsos MORI.

Personal life 
Worcester is described as a "staunch monarchist". He holds joint American and British citizenship.

He and his wife, Margaret, lived at the 13th-century Allington Castle, on the River Medway in Kent. Lady Margaret died peacefully on 20 December 2020, aged 87.

Awards and honours 
He was appointed Knight Commander of the Most Excellent Order of the British Empire (KBE) in 2005 in recognition of the "outstanding services rendered to political, social and economic research and for contribution to government policy and programmes".

He is an Honorary Fellow of the London School of Economics and Political Science and of King's College London, holds six honorary doctorates, and the Distinguished Graduate award of the University of Kansas.

References

External links

LSE British Politics and Policy: Worcester's Blog – Politics Blog by Robert Worcester
Public Opinion in Britain – talk by Robert Worcester at the 2001 Trilateral Commission meeting
Interviewed on ANN TV 2015 about the Magna Carta and on democracy

1933 births
Living people
Knights Commander of the Order of the British Empire
Voting theorists
Businesspeople from Kansas City, Missouri
Naturalised citizens of the United Kingdom
English businesspeople
Chancellors of the University of Kent
Fellows of King's College London
American emigrants to England
Deputy Lieutenants of Kent
British management consultants
British monarchists
McKinsey & Company people
Chief financial officers
Honorary Fellows of the London School of Economics